Murray is a defunct electoral district that elected members to the House of Assembly, the lower house of the bicameral legislature of the Australian state of South Australia. The electorate, incorporating part of the River Murray, was rural in nature, with Mannum the only large town within its boundaries. From its establishment to the 1938 state election, Murray was a three-member electorate, but was made a single-member electorate afterwards, as part of a system of electoral malapportionment known as the "Playmander". In both incarnations it elected candidates from both major parties as marginal and safe seat holders at various times. If just 21 LCL votes were Labor votes in Murray at the 1968 election, Labor would have formed majority government. Murray was one of two gains in 1968 that put the LCL in office. The electorate was abolished prior to the 1985 election, with its territory now forming part of the districts of Hammond, Kavel, and Schubert. In total, 24 people represented Murray between 1902 and 1985, with its  most notable member being Thomas Playford IV, who later served as Premier of South Australia.

List of members

Election results

References

External links
The 13 electorates from 1902 to 1915: The Adelaide Chronicle

Former electoral districts of South Australia
1902 establishments in Australia
1985 disestablishments in Australia